Nho Quan is a rural district of Ninh Bình province in the Red River Delta region of Vietnam. As of 2003, the district had a population of 145,186. The district covers an area of 452 km². The district capital lies at Nho Quan.

References

External links 

Districts of Ninh Bình province